Santa Fe Stampede is a 1938 American "Three Mesquiteers" Western film directed by George Sherman and starring John Wayne, Ray Corrigan, and Max Terhune. Wayne played the lead in eight of the fifty-one films in the popular series.

Plot summary

Cast
 John Wayne as Stony Brooke
 Ray Corrigan as Tucson Smith
 Max Terhune as Lullaby Joslin
 Elmer as Elmer (Lullaby Joslin's Ventriloquist Dummy) (uncredited) 
 June Martel as Nancy Carson
 William Farnum as Dave Carson
 LeRoy Mason as Mayor Gil Byron 
 Martin Spellman as Billy Carson
 Genee Hall as Julie Jane Carson
 Walter Wills as Lawyer Harris
 Ferris Taylor as Judge Henry J. Hixon
 Tom London as Marshal Jim Wood
 Dick Rush as Sheriff Tom
 James Cassidy as Jed Newton
 Richard Alexander as Joe Moffit (Henchman) (uncredited)

Reception
Frank S. Nugent of The New York Times wrote that the Three Mesquiteers' success was "probably  nobody has thought of ambushing them with a Flit gun".

See also
 John Wayne filmography

References

External links
 
 
 
 

1938 films
1938 Western (genre) films
American Western (genre) films
American black-and-white films
1930s English-language films
Three Mesquiteers films
Films directed by George Sherman
Republic Pictures films
1930s American films